Homebase is a British home improvement retailer and garden centre with stores across the United Kingdom and Republic of Ireland. Founded by Sainsbury's and GB-Inno-BM in 1979, the company was owned by Home Retail Group from October 2006, until it was sold to the Australian conglomerate Wesfarmers in January 2016.

Wesfarmers' management was not a success, which had included an attempt to rebrand the business under its Bunnings Warehouse name, and in August 2018, the business was sold to restructuring firm Hilco for £1. Subsequently, Hilco announced that it would close 42 stores of Homebase, and cut 1,500 jobs through a company voluntary arrangement, in an attempt to get the chain back to profitability. By February 2020, Homebase had 164 outlets, and was again profitable.

History
Homebase was founded by the supermarket chain Sainsbury's and Belgian retailer GB-Inno-BM in 1979, as Sainsbury's Homebase. The goal was to bring a supermarket style layout to the British Do It Yourself (DIY) market. The first store was in Croydon, opening on 3 March 1981, located on the Purley Way.

Homebase tripled in size in January 1995, when Sainsbury's bought rival store group Texas Homecare from Ladbrokes. These stores were rebranded and converted to the Homebase format, beginning in February 1996, with the store in Longwell Green, Bristol. The transformation was completed by 1999.

By the time of the purchase, Texas had staff totalling 11,600, and Homebase had 4,500.

In October 1999, Sainsbury's bought Hampden Group, the franchisee of ten Homebase stores in Ireland. In August 2000, the former chief executive of Texas Homecare, Ron Trenter, made an ultimately unsuccessful bid for Homebase. In September 2000, Focus Do It All considered acquiring Homebase, but instead decided to acquire Great Mills. The next month, Home Depot joined the race to acquire Homebase, but was not successful.

On 22 December 2000, Sainsbury's sold the Homebase chain in a two-part deal worth £969 million: in March 2001, the sale of the chain of 283 stores to venture capitalist Schroder Ventures generated £750 million, and the sale of 28 development sites to  Kingfisher plc, parent of Homebase rival B&Q, generated £219 million. At the time, the chain had 13% of the market in the United Kingdom, with 283 stores and 17,000 employees, behind B&Q and Focus Do It All.

Home Retail Group ownership

In November 2002, Homebase was sold again, this time to GUS plc (formerly Great Universal Stores plc) for £900 million, where it became part of Argos Retail Group (ARG). In October 2006, GUS completed a demerger of its remaining two businesses, Experian and ARG. ARG was renamed Home Retail Group, within which Homebase operated until 27 February 2016.

In October 2007, it was announced that Home Retail Group had signed a contract for the purchase of 27 leasehold properties from Focus DIY, to be bought for £40 million in cash. The properties were transferred over the period up to 31 December 2007, and were then refitted to the Homebase fascia over the course of several months.

No other infrastructure, and no merchandise stock were acquired as part of the transaction, although staff in these Focus stores transferred to Homebase.

In July 2013, Home Retail Group said the stores in Ireland had not made a profit in the previous five years, and that it intended to close three of the fifteen. In May 2014, Homebase launched the Homebase Design Centres. The new look stores had a Decorating Ideas and Advice Centre, offering touch screen technology, to help customers transform the look of rooms in their homes.

Following a review of the business, Home Retail Group announced in October 2014 that it would close around a quarter of Homebase stores by 2019, and that it would increase the number of Argos and Habitat concessions within the stores. In April 2015, former Tesco executive Echo Lu succeeded Paul Loft as Managing Director.

Wesfarmers ownership

On 18 January 2016, it was announced that Australian retailer Wesfarmers, owners of Australia's leading hardware store Bunnings, would acquire Homebase for £340 million, subject to shareholder approval. The transfer of ownership to Wesfarmers took place on 27 February 2016 and afterwards Peter Davis was appointed Managing Director, succeeding Echo Lu.

Wesfarmers announced in June 2016 that it had cancelled the plans by Home Retail Group to close seven stores, and would seek to prevent the closure of eleven others. It described the closure of five additional stores as "unavoidable". It was also announced that Archie Norman was to advise on the turnaround of Homebase under Wesfarmers.

Laura Ashley plc confirmed in October 2016 that it would remove its concessions trading in 22 Homebase stores by the second quarter of 2017, as Wesfarmers sought to remove all concessions and adopt the same business model as its Australian and New Zealand business.

Bunnings confirmed in November 2016 that the Homebase store in St Albans would be the first to be re-branded as Bunnings Warehouse as part of a trial, and opened in February 2017. An additional three were planned to be opened by June 2017, with up to six more completed by the end of the year. The stores adopted a low-cost warehouse model.

In February 2018, Wesfarmers reported losses relating to the takeover of £57 million in the year to June 2017, and stated that it would begin a review of the business. Wesfarmers sought buyers for the business in March, and by May, had received bids from restructuring firms Alteri Investors and Hilco.

Hilco ownership
On 25 May 2018, it was announced that Homebase had been sold by Wesfarmers to turnaround specialists Hilco, for a nominal one pound sterling. Hilco took ownership of the business on 12 June 2018. All 24 stores converted to the Bunnings format were rebranded back to Homebase. At the end of August 2018, a company voluntary arrangement (CVA) proposed by Hilco to close 42 stores, and reduce rent on others, was approved by Homebase's creditors.

The stores identified for closure in the CVA were planned to close by the beginning of 2019. Homebase secured a £95 million asset lending contract with Wells Fargo Capital Finance on 26 November 2018.

On 24 December 2018, Hilco opened its first redesigned store nicknamed BoB (Best of Both) in Orpington. The store featured traditional Homebase "gondola" shelving alongside the Bunnings red racking, with a heavy focus on decorating, moving away from Wesfarmers' primary focus on tools. At that time Homebase had over 170 stores in the United Kingdom, with a further eleven in Ireland.

In February 2020, it was announced that Homebase had returned to profit earlier than initially forecast, with nearly all of its 164 locations profitable. The company claims that its overhauled website, and the reintroduction of in-store concessions (many of which were removed by Wesfarmers) had helped it to achieve the reprise. Homebase confirmed that it would exit its CVA earlier than planned by April 2020. Hilco put Homebase back up for sale in November 2020.

Operations

The company moved its headquarters within Milton Keynes in December 2016, from premises previously shared with former sister company Argos.

Supply chain
Early in its history, Homebase used its Sainsbury's experience to move into using central warehouses from which to deliver its stock. By the 1990s, it was receiving the vast majority of its stock into central warehouses, then delivering it to stores. Homebase still receives a few direct deliveries to its stores, from manufacturers and vendors.

Loyalty scheme
In May 2009, Homebase discontinued its own loyalty programme, the Spend & Save Card, and replaced it with the Nectar loyalty card scheme, the United Kingdom's largest retail loyalty card. The Spend & Save card had been used by Homebase since 1982, and was believed to be one of the first store loyalty cards in the world.

Following the sale to Wesfarmers, Homebase left the Nectar scheme on 31 December 2016.

Advertising
From 1999 to 2005, Homebase used former Men Behaving Badly couple Neil Morrissey and Leslie Ash as a couple. Morrissey and Ash were the face of the brand for six years, until March 2005, when Homebase launched a series of new advertisements created by Abbott Mead Vickers BBDO, featuring the new slogan "Make a house a home."

From 2005 to 2008, Homebase used the song "Love Machine" by Girls Aloud in their television adverts. From 2007 to 2008, "Orinoco Flow" by Enya was used. From 2009 to 2013, "Young Folks" by Peter Bjorn and John featuring Victoria Bergsman was used.

Controversies
In April 2013, Homebase faced criticism over a poster in a London store. The poster appeared to highlight the benefits of free labour through work experience, called Workfare. The offending poster depicted a number of volunteer staff at the Haringey branch and was captioned: "How the work experience programme can benefit your store. Would 750 hours with no payroll costs help YOUR store?"

Homebase released contradictory statements, the first stating 'The company is not signed up to the Workfare Programme' and the second that 'we have decided to make no further commitment to the Job Centre work experience programme'.

Protest groups called Homebase's scheme a "profit driven attack" on workers and benefit claimants, adding "We hope Homebase will soon join, Wilko, Superdrug and more than twenty other companies who have ended their involvement with workfare. However we are prepared for further protests in the weeks and months ahead should they fail to do so."

References

External links

 

Companies based in Milton Keynes
Retail companies established in 1979
1979 establishments in the United Kingdom
Garden centres
British brands
Home improvement companies of the United Kingdom
Sainsbury's
2018 mergers and acquisitions